The term eye in the sky may refer to:

Film and TV 
 Eye in the Sky (2007 film), a Hong Kong espionage and surveillance thriller set in the same city
 Eye in the Sky (2015 film), a British thriller film featuring drone warfare
 Eye in the Sky (TV series), a 2015 TVB drama

Other 
 Eye in the Sky (album), an album by The Alan Parsons Project
 "Eye in the Sky" (song) on this album
 Eye in the sky (camera), a closed-circuit camera in casino jargon
 Eye in the Sky (novel), a 1957 science fiction novel by Philip K. Dick
 "Eye in the Sky", a song by Reks from his album The Greatest X